Abraham Lincoln Brick (May 27, 1860 – April 7, 1908) was an American attorney and politician. He served five terms in the United States House of Representatives from 1899 until his death in 1908.

Early life and education
Abraham Lincoln Brick was born on his father's farm, near South Bend, St. Joseph County, Indiana on May 27, 1860. Brick attended the common schools and was graduated from the South Bend High School. He later attended Cornell University and Yale University, and graduated from the law department of the University of Michigan at Ann Arbor in 1883.

Career and life
He was admitted to the bar the same year and commenced practice in South Bend, St. Joseph County, Indiana. He served as prosecuting attorney for the counties of St. Joseph and La Porte in 1886 and delegate to the Republican National Convention in 1896.

Politics
Brick was elected as a Republican to the Fifty-Sixth and to the four succeeding Congresses and served from March 4, 1899, until his death.

Death and legacy

Brick died in Indianapolis, Indiana, on April 7, 1908. He was interred in Riverview Cemetery in South Bend.

Brick's papers are held in the collection of the Indiana State Library.

See also 
 List of United States Congress members who died in office (1900–49)

References

External links
 
 
 Abraham L. Brick, late a representative from Indiana, Memorial addresses delivered in the House of Representatives and Senate frontispiece 1909

1860 births
1908 deaths
Cornell University alumni
Yale University alumni
University of Michigan Law School alumni
Politicians from South Bend, Indiana
Indiana lawyers
American prosecutors
19th-century American politicians
District attorneys in Indiana
20th-century American politicians
Republican Party members of the United States House of Representatives from Indiana